The men's football tournament at the 2000 Summer Olympics was held in Sydney and four other cities in Australia from 15 to 30 September. It was the 22nd edition of the men's Olympic football tournament.

The final, played at the Olympic Stadium in Sydney, Australia, attracted the Olympic Games Football attendance record of 104,098 which broke the previous record of 101,799 set at the Rose Bowl for the gold medal match of the 1984 Summer Olympics in Los Angeles, with Cameroon winning the gold.

Competition schedule
The match schedule of the tournament.

Qualification
The following 16 teams qualified for the 2000 Olympic men's football tournament:

Four countries competed for the first time in 2000: the Czech Republic and Slovakia (previously champions together as Czechoslovakia at the 1980 Summer Olympics), South Africa and Honduras.

Squads

Venues
Six venues were used during the tournament, four of them outside of Sydney at cities around Australia. Olympic stadium hosted the Final.

Match officials

Africa
 Mourad Daami
 Falla N'Doye
 Felix Tangawarima

Asia
 Lu Jun
 Saad Mane

North and Central America
 Peter Prendergast
 Felipe Ramos

South America
 Mario Sánchez Yantén
 Carlos Simon

Europe
 Stéphane Bré
 Herbert Fandel
 Ľuboš Micheľ

Oceania
 Simon Micallef
 Bruce Grimshaw

Seeding

Group stage

Group A

Group B

Group C

Group D

Knockout stage
Note: Extra time periods were played under the golden goal rule.

Quarter-finals

Semi-finals

Bronze medal match

Gold medal match

Final ranking

Statistics

Goalscorers

With six goals, Iván Zamorano of Chile is the top goalscorer in the tournament. In total, 103 goals were scored by 62 different players, with six of them credited as own goals.

6 goals
 Iván Zamorano

4 goals

 Patrick M'Boma
 Reinaldo Navia
 David Suazo

3 goals

 Lauren
 Naohiro Takahara
 Khalaf Al-Mutairi
 Victor Agali
 Gabri
 José Mari
 Peter Vagenas

2 goals

 Alex
 Edu
 Lukáš Došek
 Gianni Comandini
 Faraj Saeed
 Andrej Porázik
 Siyabonga Nomvethe
 Xavi
 Chris Albright
 Josh Wolff

1 goal

 Hayden Foxe
 Kasey Wehrman
 Ronaldinho
 Nicolas Alnoudji
 Samuel Eto'o
 Modeste M'bami
 Pablo Contreras
 Rafael Olarra
 Rodrigo Tello
 Marek Heinz
 Roman Lengyel
 Julio César de León
 Massimo Ambrosini
 Andrea Pirlo
 Junichi Inamoto
 Hidetoshi Nakata
 Atsushi Yanagisawa
 Lee Dong-gook
 Lee Chun-soo
 Bader Najem
 El Houssaine Ouchla
 Bright Igbinadolor
 Pius Ikedia
 Garba Lawal
 Juraj Czinege
 Ján Šlahor
 Quinton Fortune
 Steve Lekoelea
 Benni McCarthy
 Miguel Ángel Angulo
 Jesús Lacruz
 Raúl Tamudo
 Toni Velamazán
 Danny Califf
 Landon Donovan

1 own goal

 Patrice Abanda (playing against Chile)
 Jaime Rosales (playing against Australia)
 Alessandro Nesta (playing against Honduras)
 Samuel Okunowo (playing against Italy)
 Marián Čišovský (playing against Brazil)
 Iván Amaya (playing against Cameroon)

References

Bibliography

External links
Olympic Football Tournaments Sydney 2000 - Men, FIFA.com
RSSSF Summary
FIFA Technical Report (Part 1), (Part 2), (Part 3) and (Part 4)

Men
Men's events at the 2000 Summer Olympics